Pancho Gonzales defeated Ted Schroeder 16–18, 2–6, 6–1, 6–2, 6–4 in the final to win the men's singles tennis title at the 1949 U.S. National Championships.

Seeds
The tournament used two lists of ten players for seeding the men's singles event; one for U.S. players and one for foreign players. Pancho Gonzales is the champion; others show the round in which they were eliminated.

U.S.
  Ted Schroeder (finalist)
  Pancho Gonzales (champion)
  Bill Talbert (semifinals)
  Gardnar Mulloy (quarterfinals)
  Frank Parker (semifinals)
  Arthur Larsen (quarterfinals)
  Earl Cochell (third round)
  Herbie Flam (first round)
  Vic Seixas (first round)
  Samuel Match (third round)

Foreign
  Eric Sturgess (third round)
  Jaroslav Drobný (quarterfinals)
  Frank Sedgman (quarterfinals)
  John Bromwich (third round)
  Giovanni Cucelli (second round)
  Felicisimo Ampon (third round)
  Robert Abdesselam (third round)
  Marcello Del Bello (second round)
  George Worthington (first round)
  Vladimír Černík (second round)

Draw

Key
 Q = Qualifier
 WC = Wild card
 LL = Lucky loser
 r = Retired

Final eight

Earlier rounds

Section 1

Section 2

Section 3

Section 4

References

External links
 1949 U.S. National Championships on ITFtennis.com, the source for this draw

Men's Singles
1949